The 1852 United States presidential election in Texas was held on November 2, 1852, as part of the 1852 United States presidential election. State voters chose four electors to represent the state in the Electoral College, which chose the president and vice president.

Texas voted for the Democratic nominee Franklin Pierce, who received 73.068% of Texas's votes. Texas was Pierce's strongest state by about 9% (Georgia was 2nd with 62.7% of the vote from the state).

Results

See also
 United States presidential elections in Texas

References

1852
Texas
1852 Texas elections